Long Live Independence is a South Korea observation reality show program that shows celebrities who have never lived alone in their whole lives as they learn how to strike out on their own and live independently for the first time. The show will follow these celebrities throughout the whole process of living independently, including finding their own house themselves. The show airs on JTBC every Monday at 22:30 (KST) starting from February 22, 2021.

Broadcast schedule

MC 
 Kim Hee-chul (Super Junior) (Ep.112)
 Boom (Ep.16)

Cast 
 Song Eun-i
 Jae Jae
 AKMU
 Kim Min-seok

List of Guests and Ratings 
 Ratings listed below are the individual corner ratings of Long Live Independence. (Note: Individual corner ratings do not include commercial time, which regular ratings include.)

References

External links 
 Official website 

South Korean reality television series
South Korean variety television shows
2021 South Korean television series debuts
Korean-language television shows
2021 South Korean television series endings